Qeysvand or Qeysavand or Qeysevand may refer to:
 Qeysevand, Kermanshah
 Qeysevand, Kuzaran, Kermanshah County, Kermanshah Province
 Qeysvand, Harsin, Kermanshah Province